Kim Geon-hee (born 9 August 2000) is a South Korean short track speed skater.

She participated at the 2019 World Short Track Speed Skating Championships, winning a medal.

References

External links

2000 births
Living people
South Korean female short track speed skaters
World Short Track Speed Skating Championships medalists
Asian Games gold medalists for South Korea
Asian Games medalists in short track speed skating
Medalists at the 2017 Asian Winter Games
Short track speed skaters at the 2017 Asian Winter Games
21st-century South Korean women
Competitors at the 2023 Winter World University Games
Medalists at the 2023 Winter World University Games
Universiade medalists in short track speed skating
Universiade gold medalists for South Korea
Universiade silver medalists for South Korea